This is a list of hospitals in Israel by district and city.

Central District

Be'er Ya'akov
Yitzhak Shamir Medical Center (formerly Assaf Harofeh Medical Center)
Shmuel HaRofeh Geriatric Hospital

Gedera
Ganim Sanatorium
Herzfeld Geriatric Hospital

Hod HaSharon
Hedvat Horim Geriatric Hospital
Shalvata (psychiatric)

Hof HaSharon Regional Council
Kiryat Shlomo Geriatric Hospital

Kfar Saba
Meir Hospital (Sapir Medical Center)

Lev HaSharon Regional Council
Lev HaSharon Psychiatric Hospital

Ness Ziona
Ness Ziona Psychiatric Hospital

Netanya
Laniado Hospital
Lev Hasharon (psychiatric)
Netanya Geriatric Medical Center

Petah Tikva
Schneider Children's Medical Center of Israel
 Beit Rivka Geriatric Hospital
Rabin Medical Center
Beilinson Campus
Geha Psychiatric Hospital
Golda–HaSharon Campus

Ra'anana
Loewenstein Hospital Rehabilitation Center

Rehovot
Kaplan Medical Center

Haifa District

Daliyat al-Karmel
Dekel Medical Center

Hadera
Hillel Yaffe Medical Center

Haifa
General hospitals:
Bnai Zion Medical Center (Rothschild)
 (Lady Davis)
Rambam Medical Center
Horev Medical Center

Specialised hospitals and research facilities:
Elisha Hospital
Fliman Geriatric Hospital
Italian Hospital in Haifa
Lin Medical Center (associated with Carmel Hospital, outpatient service)

Kiryat Ata
Kiryat Binyamin Hospital

Pardes Hanna-Karkur 

 Neve Shalva (psychiatric)
 Shoham Medical Center (geriatric)
 Sha'ar Menashe (psychiatric)

Tirat HaCarmel

Jerusalem District

Jerusalem
See Muristan for the Crusader-era hospital in Jerusalem.
General hospitals:
Shaare Zedek Medical Center
Bikur Holim Hospital
Hadassah Ein Kerem Hospital
Hadassah Mount Scopus Hospital
Augusta Victoria Hospital
Al-Makassed Islamic Charitable Hospital (Al-Quds University Teaching Hospital)

Specialised hospitals:
ALYN Hospital Pediatric and Adolescent Rehabilitation Center
Kfar Shaul Mental Health Center (psychiatric)
Issam al-Jeobi Geriatric Hospital (Beit Hanina)
Saint John Eye Hospital Group (formerly St John Ophthalmic Hospital)
Eitanim (psychiatric)
Herzog Hospital
Misgav Ladach
Saint Louis French Hospital (palliative care)

Ma'ale Adumim 

 Amal, Hod Adumim (geriatric, rehabilitation)

Northern District

Afula
HaEmek Medical Center

Acre

Tiberias
Baruch Padeh Medical Center (Poriya Medical Center)

Nahariya
Galilee Medical Center

Nazareth
EMMS Nazareth Hospital ("The Scottish Hospital")

Safed
Rebecca Sieff Hospital
Hadassah Hospital

Southern District

Ashdod
Assuta Ashdod Medical Center

Ashkelon
Barzilai Medical Center

Beersheba
Soroka Medical Center

Eilat
Yoseftal Medical Center

Tel Aviv District

Bat Yam

Bayit Balev Rehabilitation Hospital

Bnei Brak
Mayanei Hayeshua Medical Center

Herzliya
Herzliya Medical Center

Holon
Wolfson Medical Center

Ramat Gan
Sheba Medical Center (Tel HaShomer Hospital)

Rishon Lezion 

 Assuta Medical Center

Tel Aviv
Assuta Medical Center
Naot Hatikhon Geriatric Center

Tel Aviv Sourasky Medical Center
Ichilov Hospital
Lis Maternity and Women's Hospital
Dana-Dwek Children's Hospital
Rehabilitation Hospital

Jaffa

References

External links

Israel
List
Hospitalsi
Israel